William Atkins was Dean of Ferns  from 1863 until 1879: his wife Elizabeth died on 13 February 1887.

Notes

 

Alumni of Trinity College Dublin
Deans of Ferns
1892 deaths
Year of birth missing